Yeast ribonuclease is an enzyme. This enzyme catalyses the following chemical reaction

 Exonucleolytic cleavage to nucleoside 3'-phosphates

This enzyme is similar RNase U4.

References

External links 

EC 3.1.14